In geometry the Gossard perspector (also called the Zeeman–Gossard perspector) is a special point associated with a plane triangle.  It is a triangle center and it is designated as X(402) in Clark Kimberling's Encyclopedia of Triangle Centers. The point was named Gossard perspector by John Conway in 1998 in honour of   Harry Clinton Gossard who discovered its existence in 1916. Later it was learned
that the point had appeared in an article by Christopher Zeeman published during 1899 – 1902. From 2003 onwards the Encyclopedia of Triangle Centers has been referring to this point as Zeeman–Gossard perspector.

Definition

Gossard triangle

Let ABC be any triangle. Let the Euler line of triangle ABC meet the sidelines BC, CA and AB of triangle ABC at D, E and F respectively. Let AgBgCg be the triangle formed by the Euler lines of the triangles AEF, BFD and CDE, the vertex Ag being the intersection of the Euler lines of the triangles BFD and CDE, and similarly for the other two vertices. 
The triangle AgBgCg is called the Gossard triangle of triangle ABC.

Gossard perspector

Let ABC be any triangle and let AgBgCg be its Gossard triangle.  Then the lines AAg, BBg and CCg are concurrent. The point of concurrence is called the Gossard perspector of triangle ABC.

Properties
Let AgBgCg be the Gossard triangle of triangle ABC. The lines BgCg, CgAg and AgBg are respectively parallel to the lines BC, CA and AB. 
Any triangle and its Gossard triangle are congruent.
Any triangle and its Gossard triangle have the same Euler line.
The Gossard triangle of triangle ABC is the reflection of triangle ABC in the Gossard perspector.

Trilinear coordinates

The trilinear coordinates of the Gossard perspector of triangle ABC are
 ( f ( a, b, c ) : f ( b, c, a ) : f ( c, a, b ) )
where
 f ( a, b, c ) = p ( a, b, c ) y ( a, b, c ) / a 
where
 p ( a, b, c ) = 2a4 − a2b2 − a2c2 − ( b2 − c2 )2
and
 y ( a, b, c ) = a8 − a6 ( b2 + c2 ) + a4 ( 2b2 − c2 ) ( 2c2 − b2 ) + ( b2 − c2 )2 [ 3a2 ( b2 + c2 ) − b4 − c4 − 3b2c2 ]

Generalisations
The construction yielding the Gossard triangle of a triangle ABC can be generalised to produce triangles A'B'C'  which are congruent to triangle ABC and whose sidelines are parallel to the sidelines of triangle ABC.

Generalisation 1 

This result is due to Christopher Zeeman.

Let l be any line parallel to the Euler line of triangle ABC. Let l intersect the sidelines BC, CA, AB of triangle ABC at X, Y, Z respectively. Let A'B'C'  be the triangle formed by the Euler lines of the triangles AYZ, BZX and CXY. Then triangle A'B'C'  is congruent to triangle ABC and its sidelines are parallel to the sidelines of triangle ABC.

Generalisation 2 

This generalisation is due to Paul Yiu.

Let P be any point in the plane of the triangle ABC different from its centroid G.
Let the line PG meet the sidelines BC, CA and AB at X, Y and Z respectively. 
Let the centroids of the triangles AYZ, BZX and CXY be Ga, Gb and Gc respectively.
Let Pa be a point such that YPa is parallel to CP and ZPa is parallel to BP.
Let Pb be a point such that ZPb is parallel to AP and XPb is parallel to CP.
Let Pc be a point such that XPc is parallel to BP and YPc is parallel to AP.
Let A'B'C'  be the triangle formed by the lines GaPa, GbPb and GcPc.
Then the triangle A'B'C'  is congruent to triangle ABC and its sides are parallel to the sides of triangle ABC.

When P coincides with the orthocenter H of triangle ABC then the line PG coincides with the Euler line of triangle ABC. The triangle A'B'C'  coincides with the Gossard triangle AgBgCg of triangle ABC.

Generalisation 3 

Let ABC be a triangle. Let H and O be two points, and let the line HO meets BC, CA, AB at A0, B0, C0 respectively. Let AH and AO be two points such that C0AH parallel to BH, B0AH parallel to CH and C0AO parallel to BO, B0AO parallel to CO. Define BH, BO, CH, CO cyclically. Then the triangle formed by the lines AHAO, BHBO, CHCO and triangle ABC are homothetic and congruent, and the homothetic center lies on the line OH.  If OH is any line through the centroid of triangle ABC, this problem is the Yiu's generalization of the Gossard perspector theorem.

References

Triangle centers